Scopula rectisecta is a moth of the  family Geometridae. It is found in Cameroon, the Democratic Republic of Congo and Equatorial Guinea (Bioko).

References

Moths described in 1920
rectisecta
Moths of Africa
Fauna of Bioko